Amazing Things may refer to:

 Amazing Things (Runrig album), released in 1993
 Amazing Things (Don Broco album), released in 2021